The 1982–83 NBA season was the Clippers' 13th season in the NBA and their 5th season in the city of San Diego.

Draft picks

Roster
{| class="toccolours" style="font-size: 95%; width: 100%;"
|-
! colspan="2" style="background-color: #E23B45;  color: #FFFFFF; text-align: center;" | San Diego Clippers 1982-1983 roster
|- style="background-color: #106BB4; color: #FFFFFF;   text-align: center;"
! Players !! Coaches
|-
| valign="top" |
{| class="sortable" style="background:transparent; margin:0px; width:100%;"
! Pos. !! # !! Nat. !! Name !! Ht. !! Wt. !! From
|-

Roster notes

Regular season

Season standings

Notes
 z, y – division champions
 x – clinched playoff spot

Record vs. opponents

Game log

Player statistics

Awards and records

Awards
 Forward Terry Cummings won the NBA Rookie of the Year Award.

Transactions
The Clippers were involved in the following transactions during the 1982–83 season.

Trades

Free agents

Additions

Subtractions

References

Los Angeles Clippers seasons
S